Barry Stock (born April 24, 1974) is a Canadian musician. He is the lead guitarist of the Canadian rock band Three Days Grace.

Biography
Stock joined Three Days Grace in 2003, shortly after the band's self-titled debut studio album was released. Stock's addition in Three Days Grace made the band a four-piece. Stock uses Schecter, Ibanez and PRS guitars, but prefers an Ibanez SZ320. He has also been seen using an Ibanez SZ4020FM Prestige. Since the discontinuation of the SZ series in 2008, Stock has started to use other guitars in the Ibanez line such as the ART series and Darkstone series. He uses Marshall Amplification and various effect pedals, mostly by Digitech. On the Live at the Palace DVD he revealed he uses Diezel Vh4 Amplifiers. At the 2010 Juno Awards, Stock presented April Wine with their induction into the Canadian Music Hall of Fame. Stock is the founder and CEO of MEAN Clothing Company.  The clothing is rock music/military inspired.   There is also a MEAN Beard division.  Stock's interests in addition to music include hunting and the outdoors.

At a young age, Stock was introduced to bands such as Black Sabbath, Van Halen and AC/DC. Stock grew up as a self taught guitarist and he originally played drums first.

Some of Stock's guitar influences include Paul Gilbert, Yngwie Malmsteen, Tony MacAlpine, Tony Iommi, Ritchie Blackmore, Stephen Carpenter of Deftones and Daron Malakian from System of a Down.

Personal life
Barry Stock is married to a woman named Heather. The two got married back in 2006. He also has a brother named Chris who is a chiropractor in Corydon, Indiana. Stock revealed he served 48 hours in jail following a DWI after a concert. Stock also had a heart attack on stage originally mistaking it as heartburn. He finished the show and sought treatment afterwards.

Discography

One-X (2006)
Life Starts Now (2009)
Transit of Venus (2012)
Human (2015)
Outsider (2018)
Explosions (2022)

Other appearances

References

1974 births
Canadian rock guitarists
Canadian male guitarists
Living people
Musicians from Ontario
Lead guitarists
Canadian heavy metal guitarists
Place of birth missing (living people)
21st-century Canadian guitarists
21st-century Canadian male musicians
Three Days Grace members